K-314 was a nuclear submarine of the Soviet Navy, of the type Project 671 "" (Yorsh, meaning ruffe; also known by its NATO reporting name of Victor I class).

On 21 March 1984, K-314 collided with the aircraft carrier  in the Sea of Japan. Kitty Hawk was not significantly damaged but the Soviet submarine could not get underway to proceed home for repairs under her own power. The destroyer  stayed on scene for several days before the Soviets could send out a seagoing tug to bring her home. Chandler offered assistance several times after daybreak but was refused by K-314s captain.

The initial collision rolled K-314 onto her back, sparing the sail, periscope and antennas.  A second strike broke loose a blade of her propeller which remained lodged in Kitty Hawks hull. Divers reportedly removed a piece as a souvenir and samples of the submarine's hull coating were examined for intelligence purposes.

References 

 Bellona: Project 671, 671 V, 671 K (Yersy) - Victor-I Class
 Bellona: Nuclear submarine accidents (This report incorrectly identifies Soviet submarine K-431 as K-314 when describing a refueling criticality accident.)

Victor-class submarines
Ships built in the Soviet Union
1972 ships
Cold War submarines of the Soviet Union
Maritime incidents in 1984